NoRedInk (stylized as noredink) is an online web-based writing education platform.

History 
NoRedInk was founded by Jeff Scheur, a high school English teacher at Whitney Young Magnet High School in Chicago. After documenting years of misconceptions that popped up in his students' writing and developing a taxonomy to address them over several years, Scheur posted an advertisement to Craigslist asking for an engineer to help him build an educational platform. Scheur's students voted on the name "NoRedInk."

In February 2012, Scheur shared the first version of NoRedInk with some colleagues at a local Illinois conference. The application grew: in a month there were 1,500 users on the site. In another month, there were 15,000 registered users. In September 2012, NoRedInk won the Citi Innovation Challenge, hosted by NBC, netting the company $75,000 in prize money. In January, 2013, NoRedInk raised $2 million from a series of investors, including Google Ventures.

References

External links 

Language learning software